The 1992 Australian Open was a tennis tournament played on outdoor hard courts at Flinders Park in Melbourne, Australia and was held from 13 through 26 January 1992. It was the 80th edition of the Australian Open and the first Grand Slam tournament of the year.

Seniors

Men's singles

 Jim Courier defeated  Stefan Edberg 6–3, 3–6, 6–4, 6–2  
 It was Courier's 2nd career Grand Slam title and his 1st Australian Open title.

Women's singles

 Monica Seles defeated  Mary Joe Fernández 6–2, 6–3 
 It was Seles' 5th career Grand Slam title and her 2nd Australian Open title.

Men's doubles

 Todd Woodbridge /  Mark Woodforde defeated  Kelly Jones /  Rick Leach 6–4, 6–3, 6–4 
 It was Woodbridge's 2nd career Grand Slam title and his 1st Australian Open title. It was Woodforde's 2nd career Grand Slam title and his 1st Australian Open title.

Women's doubles

 Arantxa Sánchez Vicario /  Helena Suková defeated  Mary Joe Fernández /  Zina Garrison 6–4, 7–6 (7–2) 
 It was Sánchez Vicario's 3rd career Grand Slam title and her 1st Australian Open title. It was Suková's 8th career Grand Slam title and her 2nd Australian Open title.

Mixed doubles

 Nicole Provis /  Mark Woodforde defeated  Arantxa Sánchez Vicario /  Todd Woodbridge 6–3, 4–6, 11–9
 It was Provis' 1st career Grand Slam title and her only Australian Open title. It was Woodforde's 3rd career Grand Slam title and his 2nd Australian Open title.

Juniors

Boys' singles
 Grant Doyle defeated  Brian Dunn 6–2, 6–0

Girls' singles
 Joanne Limmer defeated  Lindsay Davenport 7–5, 6–2

Boys' doubles
 Grant Doyle /  Brad Sceney defeated  Lex Carrington /  Jason Thompson 6–4, 6–4

Girls' doubles
 Lindsay Davenport /  Nicole London defeated  Maija Avotins /  Joanne Limmer 6–2, 7–5

Prize money

References

External links
 Australian Open official website

 
 

 
1992 in Australian tennis
January 1992 sports events in Australia
1992,Australian Open